Parliamentary elections were held in Egypt in March 1942. They were boycotted by the opposition, resulting in the ruling Wafd Party winning 240 of the 264 seats.

Results

References

Egypt
Elections in Egypt
Parliamentary election
Egyptian parliamentary election
Election and referendum articles with incomplete results